Istituto Italiano Statale Comprensivo may refer to:
 Istituto Italiano Statale Comprensivo di Barcellona
 The elementary and junior high school division of the Istituto Italiano Statale Comprensivo Di Barcellona